The 1975–76 Marquette Warriors men's basketball team represented Marquette University in NCAA Division I men's competition in the 1975–76 academic year.

At that time, Marquette was an independent school not aligned with any conference; it did not join a conference until 1988, when it joined the Midwestern Collegiate Conference, now known as the Horizon League; it would later move to the Great Midwest Conference and Conference USA before joining its current conference, the Big East, in 2005. Also, Marquette did not adopt its current nickname of "Golden Eagles" until 1994.

Roster

Schedule

|-
!colspan=9 style=| NCAA Tournament

NCAA basketball tournament
West
Marquette 79, Western Kentucky 60
Marquette 62, Western Michigan 57
Indiana 65, Marquette 56

Awards and honors

Team players drafted into the NBA

References

Marquette
Marquette Golden Eagles men's basketball seasons
Marquette
Marquette Warriors men's basketball team
Marquette Warriors men's basketball team